The 11th Biathlon World Championships were held in 1971 for the second time in Hämeenlinna-Tavastehus, Finland.

Men's results

20 km individual

4 × 7.5 km relay

Medal table

References

1971
Biathlon World Championships
International sports competitions hosted by Finland
1971 in Finnish sport
March 1971 sports events in Europe
Biathlon competitions in Finland
Sport in Hämeenlinna